{{Speciesbox
| name = Keeled greenhood
| image = LR063 72dpi Pterostylis depauperata.jpg
| image_caption = Drawing of Pterostylis depauperata by Lewis Roberts
| genus = Pterostylis
| species = depauperata
| authority = F.M.Bailey
| synonyms_ref =
| synonyms =
 Crangonorchis depauperata (F.M.Bailey) D.L.Jones & M.A.Clem.
 Diplodium depauperatum (F.M.Bailey) M.A.Clem. & D.L.Jones
}}Pterostylis depauperata, commonly known as the keeled greenhood, is a species of orchid endemic to Queensland. Flowering plants have a rosette of leaves at the base of a flowering stem with a single small white flower with pale green marks, and a few small stem leaves. Non-flowering plants only have a rosette of leaves. All three sepals on the flower have relatively long, thread-like tips.

DescriptionPterostylis depauperata is a terrestrial, perennial, deciduous, herb with an underground tuber and which often grows in colonies. Non-flowering plants have a rosette of between three and seven egg-shaped, greyish green leaves lying flat on the ground. The flowers are white with pale green striations. The dorsal sepal and petals are fused, forming a hood or "galea" over the column. Flowering occurs from March to August.

Taxonomy and namingPterostylis depauperata was first formally described in 1943 by Frederick Bailey from a specimen collected near Cairns. The description was published in the Botany Bulletin'' of the Queensland Department of Agriculture.

Distribution and habitat
The keeled greenhood grows with grasses and small shrubs in woodland and forest between Cooktown and Ravenshoe at altitudes above .

References

depauperata
Endemic orchids of Australia
Orchids of New South Wales
Plants described in 1891